Werner Boy (4 May 1879 − 6 September 1914) was a German mathematician. He was the discoverer and eponym of Boy's surface—a three-dimensional projection of the real projective plane without singularities, the first of its kind. He discovered it in 1901 after his thesis adviser, David Hilbert, asked him to prove that it was not possible to immerse the real projective plane in three-dimensional space. Boy sketched several models of the surface, and discovered that it could have 3-fold rotational symmetry, but was unable to find a parametric model for the surface. It was not until 1978 that Bernard Morin found the first parametrisation, with the aid of computers.

After completing his dissertation, Boy worked as a high school teacher in Krefeld, Germany. He later returned to his birth town of Barmen (today Wuppertal) to teach. He died as a soldier in the first weeks of World War I on 6 September 1914.

External links 
 
 Boy's original paper (in German)
 Papers and a movie about Boy's immersion

1879 births
1914 deaths
20th-century German mathematicians
German military personnel killed in World War I
German Army personnel of World War I